The Brockton Rox are a collegiate summer baseball team based in Brockton, Massachusetts, United States. Formerly a professional baseball franchise, the Rox were a member of the independent Canadian-American Association of Professional Baseball, from the 2003 through 2011 seasons. The Rox play their home games at Campanelli Stadium. The team's name is a derivative of the nearby Boston Red Sox of the American League and a tribute to the boxers Rocky Marciano and Marvelous Marvin Hagler, both from Brockton.

In 2012, the Rox announced that they were going to join the Futures Collegiate Baseball League and leave the Can-Am League but would retain its rights to rejoin the league for 2013.

As of 2022, the Rox still play in the Futures League.

History
The Rox began play in the 2002 season as members of the East Division of the Northern League. In 2003, the Eastern ball clubs split off from the rest of the Northern League and became the Northeast League, where the Rox played in 2003 and 2004. In 2005, the Northeast League was re-branded as the Can-Am League.

In 2006, the Rox celebrated the team's fifth anniversary season by finishing the season 49–43 and qualifying for the #3 seed in the Can-Am League Playoffs. The Rox defeated the New Haven County Cutters, 3–1, in the opening round best of 5 series. In the Championship Series, the Rox fell behind 2 games to 0 against the Quebec Capitales before rallying to tie the series at 2–2. In the deciding game 5, the Rox took a 3–2 lead into the 8th inning, but a late rally by Quebec left Brockton on the losing end, 5–4, giving Quebec its first ever Can-Am League Championship.

Rox DH Guye Senjem was named the Rox Most Valuable Player for 2006, and RHP John Kelly was named the team's Most Valuable Pitcher. 

Senjem, a Minnesota native, began his professional career with the St. Paul Saints in 1997. Before arriving in Brockton in 2005, he spent time in the Cincinnati Reds and Colorado Rockies organizations. He set an early tone for a successful 2006 campaign with a game-winning solo home run in the 10th inning on Opening Night at Campanelli Stadium. He went on to tie the franchise mark for home runs in a single season with 14, and led the team in home runs, and runs batted in. Twice, the left-handed hitter was named the Can-Am League’s Batter of the Week. In addition, he was named to the League's post-season All-Star team.

John Kelly was acquired by the Rox in a trade with the New Jersey Jackals in the month of June. The right-handed veteran made an immediate impact, and was nearly perfect after joining the team. He recorded a save in his first appearance, and proceeded to win his first five starts with the Rox. In 15 appearances with Brockton, he was 8-1 with a 1.92 ERA. He posted double-digit victories for the second consecutive season, finishing with 10 wins overall this year.

Before the 2009 season, the Rox hired former Atlantic City Surf President and Director of Baseball Operations Chris Carminucci as field manager. In 2009 the team won 56 games, a franchise record which was also best in the league. They lost in the first round of the playoffs, 3–1, to the eventual champion, the Quebec Capitales. Towards the end of the season, it became known that owners and management were $300,000 in debt, and they were looking to the city to restructure their lease commitments. However, with Carminucci Sports Group, which holds stock in several other minor league baseball teams in the Can-Am's sister league the American Association, taking control as the club's new managing partner, the Rox have been stabilized have had a tremendously successful 2010 season, working hard toward the playoffs.

On January 4, 2011 the Rox announced the signing of Bill Buckner as their new manager.

In December 2011, it was announced that the Rox would become an amateur collegiate summer baseball team and play in the Futures Collegiate Baseball League in 2012.

Rhett Wiseman, while playing for the Rox, was named the top prospect in the Futures Collegiate Baseball League in 2012, even though he was the only high school player on a roster of college-age players.

In 2014 Zack Short was awarded the Adam Keenan Sportsmanship and Scholarship Award and manager Bryan Stark was named the Manager of the Year.

Postseason appearances

Northeast League

Can-Am League

FCBL

 *The FCBL changed its postseason to a two-round format starting in the 2012 season
 ** A one-game Play-In round was added in the 2013 season

Logos and uniforms
The official colors of the Brockton Rox are navy blue, red, and silver. The primary logo consists of the "Rox" wordmark in red with navy blue outline, with a pair of boxing gloves (an allusion to two boxers from Brockton: Rocky Marciano and Marvelous Marvin Hagler).

The Brockton Rox game cap is navy blue with the "B" cap logo centered on the front in red with white outline.

The Rox adopted new colors following the 2010 season; the team previously wore green, black, white, and brown.

Mascot

K-O the Boxing Kangaroo is the team's mascot, due to Brockton's heritage of boxing. He debuted in 2003, and the original performer from that season was hired by the then-Tampa Bay Devil Rays to serve as their mascot. She also went on to mascot for the NHL's Tampa Bay Lightning, and currently also runs her own mascot costume company, Amazing! Mascots Inc., which is where K-O's current costume was made.

Retired numbers
The team's only retired numbers are those of men who didn't play baseball professionally. The retired numbers represent the number of fights won by two famous boxers from the area: undefeated heavyweight champion Rocky Marciano (#49) and middleweight champion "Marvelous" Marvin Hagler (#62). On May 23, 2005 the club gave a roster spot to former Boston Red Sox pitcher and colorful personality Oil Can Boyd. Boyd was not re-signed in 2006, and is currently out of baseball. Also, in 2005, the team made headlines by offering Theo Epstein a position with the team.

 42, Jackie Robinson, retired throughout baseball.
 49, Rocky Marciano (boxer, 49 career wins).
 62, Marvin Hagler (boxer, 62 career wins).

References

External links
Brockton Rox home page
http://brockton.ma.us/ City of Brockton Official Website

2002 establishments in Massachusetts
Baseball teams established in 2002
Futures Collegiate Baseball League teams
Professional baseball teams in Massachusetts
Defunct independent baseball league teams